Saša Maksimović (born 18 December 1999) is a Bosnian professional footballer who plays as a midfielder for Bosnian Premier League club Sloboda Tuzla and the Bosnia and Herzegovina U21 national team.

He started his career at Borac Šamac, before joining the youth team of Sloboda in 2017. In 2018, Maksimović was promoted to the Sloboda first team, after which he was sent on loan to Zvijezda Gradačac in January 2019. He came back to Sloboda when his loan ended.

Club career

Early career
A product of the Borac Šamac academy, Maksimović made a move to the Sloboda Tuzla academy in February 2017. He made his professional debut for Sloboda on 12 May 2018, playing 9 minutes in a Bosnian Premier League match against Mladost Doboj Kakanj, scoring his first goal for the club. He was then loaned out to First League of FBiH club Zvijezda Gradačac on 25 January 2019. On 11 June 2020, Maksimović returned from his loan to the club and also extended his contract until June 2021 with Sloboda.

International career
Maksimović represented both the Bosnia and Herzegovina U19 and U21 national teams.

Career statistics

Club

International

References

External links
Saša Maksimović at Sofascore

1999 births
Living people
People from Brčko District
Bosnia and Herzegovina footballers
First League of the Republika Srpska players
Premier League of Bosnia and Herzegovina players
First League of the Federation of Bosnia and Herzegovina players
FK Borac Šamac players
FK Sloboda Tuzla players
NK Zvijezda Gradačac players
Bosnia and Herzegovina youth international footballers
Bosnia and Herzegovina under-21 international footballers
Association football midfielders